The Clarke–McNary Act of 1924 (ch. 348, enacted June 7, 1924) was one of several pieces of United States federal legislation which expanded the Weeks Act of 1911, and was named for Representative John D. Clarke and Senator Charles McNary. 

The 1911 Weeks Act had allowed the purchase of land to enlarge the National Forest System. Two years after the Weeks Act was passed, over 700,000 acres (2,800 km²) had been purchased for the National Forest system in the Eastern United States. More than 2 million acres (8,000 km²) of land had been purchased by 1920.

The Clarke–McNary Act made it much easier for the Forest Service to buy land from willing sellers within predetermined national forest boundaries. It enabled the Secretary of Agriculture to work cooperatively with State officials for better forest protection, chiefly in fire control and water resources. It also provided for continuous production of timber. Additionally, the United States Department of Agriculture (USDA) began working with private forestland owners in reforestation. That was done by broadening the cooperative efforts to include producing and distributing tree seedlings and providing forestry assistance to farmers.

The laws also gave a strong impetus to states to establish and to support state forestry agencies. All 50 states now have a state forestry agency or forestry extension agency.

External links 
 Compilations of Agricultural Law

1924 in the environment
1924 in American law
1924 in the United States
United States federal environmental legislation
United States federal public land legislation
68th United States Congress
United States federal legislation articles without infoboxes